Jalipa is a village situated in Barmer district of Rajasthan, India. A coal mine at the village supplies lignite to the JSW Barmer Power Station.

References

Villages in Barmer district